Akihiro Lawrence Kotabe (born July 18, 1980) is an American actor. His credits include playing Ben Nakamura in The Man in the High Castle, Dead Man in Everly, Meyers in The November Man, Eric in The Assets, Akira Takahashi in Mad Men, and Shingo in The Achievers. Kotabe also provides the voice of Kyan in the CBeebies animated series Go Jetters, the title character Boyster in the Disney XD animated series Boyster, as well Conor in the podcast Passenger List.  He was nominated for Best Actor at the 2020 Madrid International Film Festival for the neo-noir film, Clay's Redemption.

Filmography

Film

Television

Video Games

References

External links 
Akie Kotabe's Official Site

1980 births
Living people
21st-century American male actors
American male film actors
American male television actors
American male voice actors
American male video game actors
American people of Japanese descent
People from Lansing, Michigan